Andrew Lake is a lake in Kandiyohi County, in the U.S. state of Minnesota.

Andrew Lake was named for Andrew Holes, a pioneer settler who carved his name on a tree near the lake shore.

See also
List of lakes in Minnesota

References

Lakes of Minnesota
Lakes of Kandiyohi County, Minnesota